Bulkemsbroek is a hamlet in the southeastern Netherlands. It is located close to the village of Simpelveld in the municipality of Simpelveld, Limburg, about 20 km east of Maastricht. The village has a population of 30 people.

The name Bulkemsbroek refers to swampland (broek) close to the land of the Bullo family (Bulkem).

On the molenbeek, a sidestream of the river Eyserbeek, lies the Bulkemsmolen. This watermill was built in 1753 and has been designated a national monument.

References 

Populated places in Limburg (Netherlands)
Simpelveld